Jim Gibbons is an American nonprofit executive and was the CEO and president of Goodwill Industries from 2008 to 2018.

Biography 
Gibbons earned his bachelor of science degree in industrial engineering from Purdue University, and attended the Harvard Graduate School of Business Administration, where he was the first blind person to receive an MBA. Before coming to Goodwill in April 2008, he was CEO for 10 years of the National Industries for the Blind. Prior to NIB, Gibbons was the president and CEO of Campus Wide Access Solutions, a subsidiary of AT&T.

Gibbons is a member of the Forbes Nonprofit Council and also serves as a member of the board of directors for the Independent Sector, the National Workforce Solutions Advisory Board and SourceAmerica.
 
He lives in Indianapolis, Indiana.

Honors 
On December 14, 2010, he was named to the newly established White House Council for Community Solutions. In 2015, he won the Henry Viscardi Achievement Awards given to leaders in the disability sector.

References 

Year of birth missing (living people)
Living people
American nonprofit chief executives
Purdue University College of Engineering alumni
Harvard Business School alumni
People from Fairfax Station, Virginia